Marie Weibull Kornias (born 1954) is a Swedish Moderate Party politician. She was a member of the Riksdag from 2006 to 2010.

External links
Marie Weibull Kornias at the Riksdag website

Members of the Riksdag from the Moderate Party
Members of the Riksdag 2006–2010
Living people
1954 births
Women members of the Riksdag
21st-century Swedish women politicians